Kosmos 1 ( meaning Cosmos 1), also known as DS-2 No.1 and occasionally in the West as Sputnik 11 was a technology demonstration and ionospheric research satellite launched by the Soviet Union in 1962. It was the first satellite to be designated under the Kosmos system, and the first spacecraft launched as part of the Dnepropetrovsk Sputnik programme to successfully reach orbit.

History 
Kosmos 1 was a DS-2 satellite, the first of two to be launched. The second, DS-2 No.2, was launched on 1 December 1964, but did not reach orbit after the payload fairing of the launch vehicle carrying it failed to separate. The DS-2 was a scaled-down version of the earlier DS-1 satellite, without the cylindrical section for avionics, which was built after the first two DS-1 spacecraft failed, DS-1 No.1 on 27 October 1961, and DS-1 No.2 on 21 December 1961, to reach orbit.

Spacecraft 
Its primary missions were to measure the performance of its launch vehicle, and to conduct research into the ionosphere.

Mission 
It was launched on Kosmos-2I 63S1 s/n 6LK launch vehicle. It was the third flight of the Kosmos-2I, and the first to successfully reach orbit. It was also the first Kosmos launch vehicle of any type to successfully place a satellite into orbit. The launch was conducted from Mayak-2 at Kapustin Yar, and occurred at 11:59 GMT on 16 March 1962. It decayed on 25 May 1962.

See also 

 1962 in spaceflight

References 

Spacecraft launched in 1962
Kosmos satellites
1962 in the Soviet Union
Spacecraft which reentered in 1962
Dnepropetrovsk Sputnik program
Technology demonstration satellites
Geospace monitoring satellites